Croaghaun is a mountain on Achill island in County Mayo, Ireland. At 688 metres (2,257 ft), it has the highest sea cliffs in Ireland  as well as the third highest sea cliffs in Europe (after Hornelen, Norway and Cape Enniberg, Faroe Islands).

Geography

Croaghaun is the most westerly peak of Achill Island, and its highest mountain. Its cliffs lie on the northern slope of the mountain. The cliffs at Croaghaun can only be seen by hiking around or to the summit of the mountain, or from the sea. They are part of a sequence of sheer rock faces which start south of Keem Bay and loop around the uninhabited north-west of the island, by Achill Head and Saddle Head, and east to Slievemore, occasionally dropping vertically into the waters of the Atlantic Ocean.

Nature

The Croaghaun cliffs are home to two families of peregrine falcons (RTÉ, 2008). September and October are the best time to see the fastest creatures on Earth here, as they teach their young to fly. Metamorphic, quartz-laden gems may be observed, along with Mediterranean heathers and the waters of the Atlantic. It is common to see schools of bottlenose dolphins and basking sharks, once a source of revenue for Achill Island (BBC, 2009). Porpoises are found in large numbers. Orcas, humpback whales, and other whales have been sighted.

See also

Lists of mountains in Ireland
Coastal landforms of Ireland

References 

Achill Island
Mountains and hills of County Mayo
Special Areas of Conservation in the Republic of Ireland
Mountains under 1000 metres